Marinel Risnita (born 16 January 1955) is a Romanian former footballer who played as a midfielder.

Career 
Risnita played in Divizia A in 1973 with FC Rapid București and would play with the team for seven seasons. In his debut season he played in 18 matches and recorded 5 goals. Throughout his tenure with Rapid București he played in the 1975–76 European Cup Winners' Cup against R.S.C. Anderlecht. In 1982, he played abroad in the National Soccer League with Toronto Italia. In his debut season in Toronto he featured in the Labatt's International tournament where he recorded a goal for Italia in a 4-1 victory over Celtic F.C. In 1985, he assisted Toronto by securing the NSL Championship title where he contributed a goal.

International career  
Risnita played with the Romania national under-21 football team and made his debut on 25 September 1973 against East Germany.

References 

Living people
1955 births
Romanian footballers
FC Rapid București players
Toronto Italia players
Liga I players
Canadian National Soccer League players
Association football midfielders
Romanian expatriate footballers
Expatriate soccer players in Canada
Romanian expatriate sportspeople in Canada